Stillingia salpingadenia is a species of flowering plant in the family Euphorbiaceae. It is native to northeast Argentina, Bolivia, west-central Brazil, and Paraguay.

It was originally described by Johannes Müller Argoviensis as Sapium salpingadenia in 1863 and moved to the genus Stillingia by Jacques Huber in 1906.

References

salpingadenia
Plants described in 1863
Taxa named by Johannes Müller Argoviensis
Flora of South America